The men's 200 metre military rifle event was one of five sport shooting events on the Shooting at the 1896 Summer Olympics programme. It was held at a distance of 200 metres, on 8 April and 9 April, with each shooter firing half of his shots on the first day and half the second. Shooters fired four strings of ten shots each, for a total of 40 shots. 42 shooters, representing each of the seven nations that had shooters in Athens, competed.

When the competition finished in the morning of 9 April, Pantelis Karasevdas of Greece had hit the target all 40 times, amassing a score of 2,350 points. Panagiotis Pavlidis hit the target 38 times and came in second.

Background

This was the only appearance of the 200 metre military rifle event. Military rifle categories would return in 1920 (a  three positions event) and 1924 (seven events at ). It was the first event held at the newly inaugurated Kallithea shooting range. A ceremonial first shot was fired by Olga Constantinovna of Russia, the queen consort of the Hellenes.

Competition format

The competition had each shooter fire 40 shots, in 4 strings of 10, at a range of 200 metres. Scoring involved multiplying target hits by points scored in each string.

Schedule

Results

Only partial results are known.

References

  (Digitally available at )
  (Excerpt available at )
 

Men's rifle military